The Chronicle of 741 (or Continuatio Byzantia-Arabica or Continuatio Isidoriana) is a Latin-language history in 43 sections or paragraphs, many of which are quite short, which was composed in about the years 741-743, in a part of Spain under Arab occupation. It is the earliest known Spanish work from the period of Arab occupation.

Contents
The work is very much shorter than the Chronicle of 754. It contains little Spanish history; the first 14 sections contain very brief mentions of the Visigothic kings up to the reign of Suintila (621-631), taken from the Historia de regibus Gothorum, Vandalorum et Suevorum of Isidore of Seville. The remainder of the content consists of alternating sections dealing with the Byzantine Emperors and the parallel leaders of the Arabs beginning with Muhammad. These sections perhaps derive from the Chronicon Mundi of John of Nikiû and from Arabic or Syriac works which have not survived. Some of these sections contain very brief mentions in passing, of the Arab invasions of North Africa, Spain, France, and parts of the Middle East.

Little if any of the content is original; the value of the work lies in what it reveals of the author and his times.

Author
The work is noted for being pro-Arab and in particular pro-Umayyad. Various theories about the author have been proposed to account for this:
he was a Christian converted to Islam, or
a Christian sympathizing with the Arabs, or
a Christian convert to Islam writing a propaganda piece under the direction of an Arab

Likewise, various cities of origin have been proposed, such as Toledo, Cordoba, Seville or Mérida, but arguments for these are based on very general considerations.

Date
The date of the work cannot be earlier than 741, as it mentions the Byzantine Emperor Leo III and the length of his reign which terminated in that year.

Martín has pointed out that the work contains the words "nostris temporibus" (our times) when saying that the caliphate was then held by a great-grandson of the caliph Marwan I. The first of Marwan's great-grandsons to hold that position was al-Walid II, and this is likely to represent the date of writing.

Notes

References
Cyrille Aillet, "The Chronicle of 741", in D. Thomas and B. Roggema (ed.), Christian–Muslim Relations: A Bibliographical History, Volume 1 (Brill, 2009), pp. 284–289.
Roger Collins, The Arab Conquest of Spain, 711-797 (Blackwell, 1989).
Dubler, C.E. (1946) "Sobre la Crónica árabigo-byzantina de 741 y la influencia bizantina en la Península Ibérica", Al-Andalus 11, 283-349.
Díaz y Díaz, M.C. (1976) "La historiographia hispana desde la invasión árabe hasta el año 1000", in De Isidoro al siglo XI. Ocho estudios sobre la vida literaria peninsular, Barcelona, 203-234.
Gil, J. (1973) Corpus Scriptorum Muzarabicorum, vol. 1, Madrid, 7-14.
Martín, Jose Carlos (2007) "Los Chronica Byzantia-Arabica", e-Spania (online)
English translation of the Chronicle by Aymenn Jawad Al-Tamimi

741
743
8th-century history books
Iberian chronicles
8th century in Al-Andalus
8th-century Latin books
8th-century Latin writers
Christianity in the Umayyad Caliphate